Juan Russo (6 August 1926 – 12 November 2016) was an Argentine weightlifter. He competed in the men's middleweight event at the 1948 Summer Olympics.

References

External links
 

1926 births
2016 deaths
Argentine male weightlifters
Olympic weightlifters of Argentina
Weightlifters at the 1948 Summer Olympics
Place of birth missing